Dayongia is a genus of trilobites in the order Phacopida, that existed during the upper Ordovician in what is now China. It was described by Xiang and Ji in 1986, and the type species is Dayongia longicephala. The type locality was the Linxiang Formation, in Hunan.

References

External links
 Dayongia at the Paleobiology Database

Encrinuridae genera
Fossil taxa described in 1986
Ordovician trilobites
Fossils of China